The 1966 Titleholders Championship was the 27th Titleholders Championship, held November 24–27 at Augusta Country Club in Augusta, Georgia. Reigning champion Kathy Whitworth successfully defended her title and won the second of her six major titles, two strokes ahead of runners-up Judy Kimball and Mary Mills.

It was Whitworth's 28th victory on the LPGA Tour and ninth of the 1966 season.

Mills was the 54-hole leader at 217 (+1), with Whitworth and Kimball a stroke back.

This was the last time the championship was held in Augusta; it took a hiatus and resumed six years later for one time only in 1972 in North Carolina.

Final leaderboard
Sunday, November 27, 1966

Source:

References

Titleholders Championship
Golf in Georgia (U.S. state)
Titleholders Championship
Titleholders Championship
Titleholders Championship
Titleholders Championship
Women's sports in Georgia (U.S. state)